Khurshid TV is an Afghan general entertainment television station based in Kabul.

History 
The channel was launched in 2011. The name of the channel is a Persian name meaning sun (see Khorshid).

Two Khurshid TV employees were wounded when their van was targeted by a bomb in Kabul in August 2019. During the May 2020 Afghanistan attacks, a vehicle belonging to Khurshid TV was apparently the target in a roadside bomb in Kabul. A journalist at Khurshid TV was killed along with the driver. The attack was widely condemned by Afghan journalists, the government and internationally. In 2021, Pahjwok Afghan News reported that some Khurshid employees had not been paid by the station. After the Taliban takeover of Afghanistan, Khurshid TV went off air.

The station's CEO was Mohammad Rafi Rafiq Sediqi. Sediqi died in November 2020 from suspected gas poisoning.

References 

Television stations in Afghanistan